Jarrad Redden (born 27 December 1990) is a former professional Australian rules footballer who played for the Port Adelaide Football Club in the Australian Football League (AFL).

Career
Redden, a ruckman, is from Yorke Peninsula and represented South Australia at the 2008 AFL Under 18 Championships, finishing the carnival third in hit-outs and hit-outs to advantage.

Taken with pick 54 in the 2008 AFL draft, Redden played in the South Australian National Football League (SANFL) as ruckmen Brendon Lade, Dean Brogan and Matthew Primus were ahead of him in Port's ruck cohort. Redden played his first senior AFL match for Port Adelaide in Round 1 of the 2012 AFL season, defeating St Kilda by four points. He was subbed off this game.

The 205 cm ruckman managed 18 and 26 hitouts in his next two games, but was then sent back to his SANFL club after the return from injury of Renouf. He averaged 18.3 HOs, 11.4 disposals and 2.1 marks for the season.

Redden was delisted by Port Adelaide at the end of the 2015 AFL season.

References

External links

1990 births
Living people
Australian rules footballers from South Australia
Woodville-West Torrens Football Club players
Port Adelaide Football Club players
Port Adelaide Football Club players (all competitions)